The United States Air Force's 88th Air Base Wing is a base support unit located at Wright-Patterson Air Force Base, Ohio. The wing has been stationed at Wright-Patterson, known familiarly as 'Wright-Patt', since its activation in 1944 as the 4000th Army Air Forces Base Unit (Command) in 1944, and from 1944 to 1994 undergone six redesignations.

Circa 2012, the wing's mission was operate the airfield, maintain all infrastructure and provide security, communications, medical, legal, personnel, contracting, finance, transportation, air traffic control, weather forecasting, public affairs, recreation and chaplain services for more than 60 associate units on Wright-Patterson AFB.

History
The unit was organized by Air Service Command to provide custodial and support functions for Wright Field.  The mission of both the unit and the AAF Technical Base expanded by early 1946, gaining full support responsibility for Patterson Field. The 2750th became host wing for Wright-Patterson AFB in October 1949, exercising command jurisdiction over the base, and providing services to Headquarters of Air Force Logistics Command and numerous tenant units.  It frequently supported regional humanitarian missions, such as the Xenia tornado relief in April 1974.  It provided logistical support and served as a port of embarkation during contingency deployments, most notably the Vietnam War in 1965–1973, as well as to the Middle East in 1990–1991.

It deployed personnel to Saudi Arabia for 'Operation Desert Shield'/Desert Storm in August 1990-May 1991.  After 1 July 1992 it provided logistic and administrative support for Headquarters, Air Force Materiel Command and the Aeronautical Systems Center, now known as the Air Force Life Cycle Management Center, as well as on-base and off-base tenant units in a five-state area and managed base facilities and resources.  It provided airfield operations, security, services, engineering, and logistical support to the Balkans Proximity Peace Talks (better known as the 'Dayton Agreement') conducted at the base in late 1995.

Inactivation of the 88th Communications Group
In an inactivation ceremony on 29 April 2022, the 88th Communications Group was inactivated. The inactivation ceremony presided by then 88th Air Base Wing Commander Colonel Patrick Miller. The 88th Communications Squadron was reallocated under the 88th Mission Support Group, while the 88th Operations Support Squadron was reallocated directly under the 88th Air Base Wing.

Lineage
 Designated as the 4000th Army Air Forces Base Unit (Command) and organized on 1 April 1944
 Redescribed 4000th Army Air Forces Base Unit (Air Base) on 21 February 1945
 Redesignated 4000th Air Force Base Unit (Air Base) on 26 September 1947
 Redesignated 2750th Air Force Base on 28 August 1948
 Redesignated 2750th Air Base Wing on 5 October 1949
 Redesignated 645th Air Base Wing on 1 October 1992
 Redesignated 88th Air Base Wing on 1 October 1994

Assignments
 Army Air Forces Technical Service Command (later Air Materiel Command, Air Force Logistics Command), 1 April 1944
 Aeronautical Systems Center, 1 July 1992 (attached to Air Force Life Cycle Management Center after 20 July 2012)
 Air Force Life Cycle Management Center, 1 October 2012

Components

Groups
 88th Communications Group (see 2046th Communications Group)
 88th Maintenance Group (see 2750th Logistics and Operations Group)
 88th Medical Group, 20 October 2004 – present
 88th Mission Support Group (see 645th Support Group)
 645th Communications-Computer Support Group (see 2046th Communications Group)
 645th Logistics and Operations Group (see 2750th Logistic and Operations Group)
 645th Support Group (later 88th Support Group, 88th Mission Support Group), 1 October 1992 – present
 2046th Communications Group (later 2046 Communications-Computer Systems Group, 645 Communications-Computer Systems Group, 88th Communications Group), c. 1 September 1990 – present
 2750th Logistics and Operations Group (later 645th Logistics and Operations Group, 88th Logistics and Operations Group, 88 Logistics Gp, 88th Maintenance Group), c. 1990-c. 2012

Squadrons
 88th Operations Support Squadron
 88th Comptroller Squadron
 88th Logistics Readiness Squadron home of the world famous Installation Deployment Readiness Cell (IDRC) 
 88th Force Support Squadron
 88th Communications Squadron
 88th Security Forces Squadron

Flight
 47th Airlift Flight, 1 October 1994 – 1 July 1995

Stations
 Patterson Field, Ohio, 1 April 1944
 Wright Field (later Wright-Patterson Air Force Base), Ohio, 18 August 1944 – present

Aircraft & Missiles Operated
C-12 Huron (1993–1997)

Unit Emblems

References

Notes
 Explanatory notes

 Citations

Bibliography

External links
 Wright-Patterson AFB Homepage

0088
Military units and formations in Ohio
Military units and formations established in 1994